David "Dave" Durepos (born July 14, 1968) is a Canadian retired wheelchair basketball player. He is married to fellow Paralympian Sabrina Pettinicchi. As a member of Team Canada, Durepos competed in five Paralympic Games where he won 3 gold medals along with one silver. On September 25, 2012, the City of Fredericton proclaimed that date to be Dave Durepos Day.

Early life
Durepos was born on July 14, 1968, in Fredericton, New Brunswick. He attended and graduated from the New Brunswick Community College in 1984 with a degree in Steel Fabrication. After suffering from a spinal cord injury due to a motorcycle crash in 1988, he lost the use of his legs.

Career
Durepos joined Canada men's national wheelchair basketball team in 1994. He served as Captain for Team Canada in the 2000 Summer Paralympics where they won their first Paralympic gold medal. As a result, Durepos became the first New Brunswick player to bring home an Olympic or Paralympic gold medal.

In the following years, he joined the National Wheelchair Basketball Association where he led the Milwaukee Bucks to a Final Four Championship title in 2002 and became the first Canadian to be named MVP in Division I of the National Wheelchair Basketball Association. He also received Queen Elizabeth II's Golden Jubilee Medal. In 2004, Durepos was selected to compete at the 2004 Summer Paralympics in Athens. While still a member of the Canada National Team, Durepos was named MVP back-to-back at the Canadian National Championships in 2006 and 2007. Before retiring, Durepos helped lead Canada to a gold medal at the 2012 Paralympic Games. After retiring in 2012, the City of Fredericton proclaimed that September 25 would be christened Dave Durepos Day. Two years later, he was inducted into the New Brunswick Sports Hall of Fame. He later coached New Brunswick's Canada Games wheelchair basketball team alongside his wife Sabrina Pettinicchi in 2015.

References

External links 
  (1996–2008)
  (2012)

1968 births
Living people
Canadian men's wheelchair basketball players
Paralympic wheelchair basketball players of Canada
Paralympic gold medalists for Canada
Paralympic silver medalists for Canada
Paralympic medalists in wheelchair basketball
Wheelchair basketball players at the 1996 Summer Paralympics
Wheelchair basketball players at the 2000 Summer Paralympics
Wheelchair basketball players at the 2004 Summer Paralympics
Wheelchair basketball players at the 2008 Summer Paralympics
Wheelchair basketball players at the 2012 Summer Paralympics
Medalists at the 2000 Summer Paralympics
Medalists at the 2004 Summer Paralympics
Medalists at the 2008 Summer Paralympics
Medalists at the 2012 Summer Paralympics
Sportspeople from Fredericton
New Brunswick Sports Hall of Fame inductees